Bisgaardia is a genus of bacteria from the family Pasteurellaceae.

References

Further reading
 

Pasteurellales
Bacteria genera